Kimi ga Iru Kara may refer to:

 "Kimi ga Iru Kara" (Sayuri Sugawara song)
 "Kimi ga Iru Kara" (Kylee song)
 "Kimi ga Iru Kara", a song by Mikuni Shimokawa